Fanny Hill is a 1968 Swedish film written and directed by Mac Ahlberg and starring Diana Kjær based on the 1748 erotic novel Memoirs of a Woman of Pleasure by John Cleland.

Cast
Diana Kjær as Fanny Hill
Hans Ernback as Roger Boman
Keve Hjelm as Leif Henning
Oscar Ljung as Otto Wilhelmson
Tina Hedström as Monika
Gio Petré as Fru Schöön
Mona Seilitz as Charlotte

Alternate version
The film was released in a 91 minute version by Cinemation Industries in the United States in September 1969. The film was rescored by Clay Pitts Productions and only 8 minutes of the original score by Georg Riedel was featured.

Reception
It was successful in the United States and Canada, earning theatrical rentals of $4 million. It was number one at the box office in the United States for a week in its seventh week of release.

References

External links

Fanny Hill at TCMDB

1968 films
1968 comedy films
Sexploitation films
Swedish comedy films
1960s Swedish-language films
Films shot in Stockholm
Films set in Stockholm
Films set in the 1960s
Films based on British novels
Films directed by Mac Ahlberg
1960s Swedish films